Here is the discography of American R&B/soul vocal group Ray, Goodman & Brown. The group originated as The Moments in the mid-1960s; great success came in the 1970s with hits including "Love on a Two-Way Street", "Sexy Mama", and "Look at Me (I'm in Love)". In 1979, for contractual reasons they changed their name to Ray, Goodman & Brown and had further hits, including No. 1 hit gold single "Special Lady". By 1988, the group had a total of 38 R&B chart hits.

The Moments discography

Studio albums

Live albums

Compilation albums

Singles

Ray, Goodman & Brown discography

Studio albums

Compilation albums

Singles

References

Discographies of American artists
Rhythm and blues discographies
Soul music discographies